The 2011 Wartburg Knights football team represented Wartburg College as a member of the Iowa Intercollegiate Athletic Conference (IIAC) during the 2011 NCAA Division III football season. Led by Rick Willis in his 13th season as head coach, the Knights compiled an overall record of 8–2 with a mark of 6–2 in conference play, finishing second in the IIAC. Wartburg was unable to defend their conference title and missed a return trip to the NCAA Division III Football Championship playoffs. The team played home games at Walston-Hoover Stadium in Waverly, Iowa.

Schedule
Wartburg's 2011 regular season scheduled consisted of five home and five away games.

References

Wartburg
Wartburg Knights football seasons
Wartburg Knights football